Laudes Organi is a piece of music for organ and choir by Zoltán Kodály. It was composed in 1966 for the National Convention of The American Guild of Organists. The composition is based on a 12tn century Sequentia "Audi chorum organicum"

The text for Laudes Organi can be found here and the score is at IMSLP (in copyright almost everywhere.)

External links

Compositions by Zoltán Kodály
Compositions for organ
1966 compositions